The Primetime Emmy Award for Outstanding Lighting Design / Lighting Direction for a Variety Special is awarded to one television special each year. Prior to 2011, the award was bestowed as Outstanding Lighting Direction (Electronic, Multi-Camera) for Variety, Music or Comedy Programming and included both series and specials.

In the following list, the first titles listed in gold are the winners; those not in gold are nominees, which are listed in alphabetical order. The years given are those in which the ceremonies took place.

Winners and nominations

1970s

1980s

1990s

Between 2000 and 2010, series and specials competed together for Outstanding Lighting Direction (Electronic).

2010s

2020s

Notes

References

Lighting Design / Lighting Direction for a Variety Special